Coenotephria is a genus of moths in the family Geometridae (Geometer moths) described by Prout in 1914. Its species are primarily found in Europe and Asia.

Selected species
Coenotephria ablutaria (Boisduval, 1840)
Coenotephria achromaria (De la Harpe, 1853)
Coenotephria adela (Butler, 1893)
Coenotephria albicoma (Inoue, 1954)
Coenotephria aleucidia (Butler, 1882)
Coenotephria ambustaria (Leech, 1897)
Coenotephria anomala (Inoue, 1954)
Coenotephria apotoma (Turner, 1907)
Coenotephria approximata (Staudinger, 1892)
Coenotephria assimilata (Walker, 1862)
Coenotephria avilaria (Reisser, 1936)
Coenotephria bellissima (Butler, 1893)
Coenotephria brevifasciata (Warren, 1888)  (from India)
Coenotephria caesaria (Constant, 1893)
Coenotephria ceres (Butler, 1882)
Coenotephria championi (Prout, 1926) (from India)
Coenotephria corticalis (Butler, 1882)
Coenotephria cylon (Druce, 1893)
Coenotephria cynthia (Butler, 1882)
Coenotephria decipiens (Butler, 1882)
Coenotephria detritata (Staudinger, 1898
Coenotephria diana (Butler, 1882)
Coenotephria dubia (Butler, 1882)
Coenotephria flavistrigata (Warren, 1888) (from India)
Coenotephria homophana (Hampson, 1895) (from India)
Coenotephria homophoeta Prout, 1926 (from India)
Coenotephria salicata (Denis & Schiffermuller, 1775) - striped twin-spot carpet
Coenotephria tophaceata (Denis & Schiffermuller, 1775)

References

Kandasamy, Gunathilagaraj (2016). "Checklist of Indian Geometridae with FBI number". Tamil Nadu Agricultural University.

Larentiinae
Geometridae